"Finally Found" is the debut single of British girl group Honeyz. It was released on 24 August 1998 as the lead single from their debut album, Wonder No. 8 (1998). The song was their most successful single in the UK and worldwide, peaking at number four on the UK Singles Chart and earning platinum status in Australia, where it peaked at number three. It reached the top 20 in Denmark, Ireland, New Zealand, and Sweden.

The song was given a slightly different mix for single release, titled the "Rude Boy Mix". This mix adds background instrumentation and more backing vocals during the song while omitting the instrumental intro and spoken French towards the end of the album version. The single was digitized, along with all other official Honeyz singles, for release on digital music stores and streaming services on May 14, 2021. The "Finally Found" single included all officially released versions of the song, plus a previously unused "radio edit" which is a different mix from both the single and album versions.

The group performed the song in 2005 for the ITV series Hit Me, Baby, One More Time, performed with the original lineup (Célena Cherry, Heavenli Denton and Naima Belkhiati).

Critical reception
An editor from Daily Record described the song as a "London-style swing beat tune". Caroline Sullivan from The Guardian felt it "faithfully reproduces the well-mannered nu-soul sound of the current American charts." Music Week named it Single of the Week, writing, "The debut single from former MW Ones To Watch, the Honeyz - namely Heavenli, Celena and Niama - is a real beauty, suggesting this act will be strong contenders in the pop R&B stakes. The song showcases the girls' vocal ability, riding a laidback melody that becomes increasingly addictive on each listen. The song has rightly achieved Radio One B-list status, and promises much more to come."

Track listings

 UK and Australian CD1
 "Finally Found"  – 4:09
 "In the Street"  – 5:29
 "Summertime" – 3:49

 UK and Australian CD2
 "Finally Found"  – 4:09
 "Summertime"  – 5:53
 "Summertime"  – 5:53

 UK cassette single and European CD single
 "Finally Found"  – 4:09
 "In the Street"  – 5:29

 2021 digital release
 "Finally Found"  – 3:43
 "Finally Found"  – 4:09
 "Finally Found"  – 4:37
 "Finally Found"  – 3:45
 "In the Street"  – 5:28
 "In the Street"  – 5:34
 "Summertime" – 3:50
 "Summertime"  – 5:54
 "Summertime"  – 5:55
 "Summertime"  – 3:34
Note: Tracks 1 and 10 were previously unreleased commercially. Tracks 4 and 6 were originally released on "Love of a Lifetime" CD2 and "I Don't Know" CD2 respectively.

Charts

Weekly charts

Year-end charts

Certifications

References

1998 debut singles
1998 songs
Honeyz songs
Mercury Records singles
Neo soul songs